Aaron Albano (born January 1, 1972), better known by his stage name Ming (stylized as MING), is a Grammy Award-nominated American record producer, song writer and DJ. MING rose to prominence during the American drum and bass and turntablist movements in the late 1990s alongside DJs such as Z-Trip, DJ Spooky, The Beat Junkies, J-Boogie and DJ Craze.

Early life
He was born in Syosset, New York, United States. He grew up in Stony Brook, New York and attended Ward Melville High School.
He attended University of Miami where He graduated with honors with a Bachelor of Science in Electrical Engineering with an emphasis in audio.

Early career
MING was one half of the experimental hip-hop and turntablist duo, Ming + FS, founded in 1996. The duo used breakbeats as the foundation for most of their work, but were best known for eschewing musical boundaries, freely incorporating elements of house, electro and drum and bass into their music. They dubbed this smashed-up style "junkyard", a moniker that got picked up in dance music press, and on their own releases (like 1998's “Junkyard Drum ‘n’ Bass”).  
Over the course of a decade, Ming + FS performed over 1,000 live shows in the United States and abroad. The pair released three albums on San Francisco based Om Records; Hell's Kitchen, The Human Condition and Subway Series. Ming + FS also released a five-song EP Applied Pressure on Sound Gizmo Records and a fourth album on NYC based Spun Records entitled Back to One, as well as many singles on their own Madhattan Studios label. In 2003, MING co-wrote five songs on Toby Lightman's debut record Little Things on Lava Records.

Current career
In 2006, MING opened his own label and music production company, Hood Famous Music (HFM), which he co-runs with Jumpshot, in New York City. MING has produced remixes for Beyoncé, Black Eyed Peas, Lady Gaga, Katy Perry and developed artists such as Michael Lynche, a fourth-place finisher on season 9 of American Idol. Lynche's "What Would You Say" was licensed for the film, Madea Goes to Jail.

In 2007, he opened Habitat Music which focuses on music for film, television and movies.

In 2010, MING wrote a monthly column in Electronic Musician magazine called 'Production Central', which focussed on record production technique. He also had a monthly video blog on ElectronicMusician.com that was part artists interviews and part recording technics.

In 2011, MING began regularly releasing electro house singles on HFM. In 2012 he released MING+2beeps KING KONG EP on Steve Aoki's Dim Mak Records.

In 2014, he released a trap and bass EP entitled “Blackout” on Datsik's Firepower Records.  In 2015, he was nominated for a Grammy Award for Best Remixed Recording, Non-Classical for his remix of "Crossfingers - Falling Out" feat. Danny Losito.

Commercial work
MING has produced original music for top television series including CSI: NY, CSI: Miami, Sex and the City, Weeds, Dinner Take All, and Travel Spies. MING has also created commercial scores for Sears, Nissan, Burger King, Nokia, AT&T, Doritos and Chevy. (note MING's cameo in the Nissan commercial).

Discography

Albums
 Abstract the Ism - “Paper Dragon” (2014) Hood Famous Music
 Ming + FS - “Subway Series” (2002) Om Records
 Ming + FS - “The Human Condition” (2001) Om Records
 Ming + FS - “Hell’s Kitchen” (1999) Om Records

Singles and EPs

Mixes

Remixes

Notes and references

External links

Official Label Site

1972 births
Living people
Club DJs
Remixers
American dance musicians
American house musicians
American pop musicians
Musicians from New York City
Ward Melville High School alumni